She Done Him Right  is a 1940 American comedy film directed by William Beaudine. It was released by Dixie National Pictures Inc..

References

External links
 

1940 films
1940 comedy films
American black-and-white films
Films directed by William Beaudine
American comedy films
1940s American films